Lampeia (Greek: Λάμπεια, before 1928: Δίβρη - Divri, between 1928 and 1929: Πρινόφυτον - Prinofyton) is a mountain village, a community and a former municipality in Elis, West Greece, Greece. Since the 2011 local government reform it is part of the municipality Archaia Olympia, of which it is a municipal unit. The municipal unit has an area of 72.447 km2. In 2011 the population of the village was 468, and of the community, which includes the village Amygdali, 529.

Lampeia is situated south of Mount Erymanthos, in the valley of a tributary of the river Erymanthos. Its elevation is about 800 m above sea level. The Greek National Road 33 (Patras - Tripoli) passes through it. Lampeia is 4 km west of Oreini, 9 km northeast of Koumanis, 28 km northeast of Olympia and 45 km south of Patras.

Subdivisions
The municipal unit Lampeia is subdivided into the following communities (constituent villages in brackets):
Astras (Astras, Kalyvia Astra)
Lampeia (Lampeia, Amygdali)
Oreini (Oreini, Paliofytia)

Population

History

The name Lampeia was taken from the mountain Lampeia, which is part of the Erymanthos range. According to Pausanias the river Erymanthos has its source on the mountain Lampeia, which is sacred to Pan. The area was part of Arcadia. Due to its inaccessibility, Lampeia saw few invaders. Also the Ottomans stayed in the lower areas for strategic reasons. The Zoodochos Pigi monastery in Lampeia was a centre of Greek culture and education. Several inhabitants fought in the Greek War of Independence, and some well known families of politicians (Petralias, Panagoulis, Stefanopoulos, Zafeiropoulos) came from Divri/Lampeia.

Lampeia was created as one of the eight municipalities of the Elis prefecture in the 1830s, and was disbanded in 1913. This municipality was larger than the present municipal unit, and included several villages now in adjacent municipal units (among others Koumanis, Antroni and Klindia). The municipality was recreated under the Capodistrian Plan in the late-1990s, and became a subdivision of the municipality of Archaia Olympia in 2011.

Notable people 
Pavlos Matesis, writer

See also
List of settlements in Elis

References

External links

MyDivri.gr  A great site with news, photos and historical information on Divri (Δίβρη)/Lambia (Λαμπεία) (in Greek and English)
Antroni - Labeia (in Greek)
Video from the ERT program Traveling in Greece (Menoume Ellada) shown on ET1

Populated places in Elis
Municipalities of Greece